The McLaren M21 is an open-wheel race car, designed and developed by Australian designer Ralph Bellamy, and built by British constructor and racing team, McLaren, to compete in the European Formula Two Championship in 1972. It was designed to be lower, flatter, and squarer, and more aggressive in stance and design than its predecessor, with the monocoque being positioned, but still retained the regular front-and-rear outboard suspension.It was driven by South African Jody Scheckter. It won one race, at Crystal Palace in 1972, with Scheckter eventually finishing 8th-place in the championship, scoring 15 points. It suffered numerous mechanical and technical problems, including engine failures and handling problems, which prevented it from winning more races. It was powered by either a naturally aspirated  Ford-Cosworth BDA four-cylinder engine, tuned to produce , or a larger bored-out  Ford-Cosworth BDF, tuned to develop .

References

External links 
 

Formula Two cars
McLaren racing cars